IHM Societe Anonyme

Organizations
 Sisters of the Immaculate Heart of Mary, a Catholic religious order founded in 1848
 Sisters, Servants of the Immaculate Heart of Mary, US Catholic religious order founded in 1842
 Institute of Healthcare Management, former name of Institute of Health and Social Care Management, a UK professional organisation
Institute of Hotel Management, a multi-location India-based hospitality management school

People with the name
 Joe Ihm (1889–1951), a member of the Missouri House of Representatives
 Jisoon Ihm (born 1951), a South Korean physicist and professor in the School of Physics at Seoul National University

See also
 Ihm House (disambiguation)
 Institute of Hotel Management (disambiguation)